Ženski košarkaški klub Herceg Novi is a former Montenegrin women's basketball team from Herceg Novi, Montenegro.

Notable former players

Notable former coaches
Milan Dabović

External links
 Profile on eurobasket.com

Herceg Novi
Basketball teams established in 1987
Herceg Novi